The One Hundred Eighteenth Ohio General Assembly was the legislative body of the state of Ohio in 1989 and 1990. In this General Assembly, the Ohio Senate was controlled by the Republican Party and the Ohio House of Representatives was controlled by the Democratic Party.  In the Senate, there were 18 Republicans and 15 Democrats. In the House, there were 60 Democrats and 39 Republicans.

Major events

Vacancies
April 24, 1989: Representative Jolynn Boster (D-94th) resigns to head the PUCO.
December 31, 1989: Senator Michael White (D-21st) resigns.
May 23, 1990: Representative John Shivers (D-3rd) resigns to become a judge in Columbiana County, Ohio.
July 20, 1990: Representative Tom Pottenger (R-20th) resigns.

Appointments
May 9, 1989: Mary Abel is appointed to the 94th House District due to the resignation of Jolynn Boster.
January 3, 1990: Jeffrey Johnson is appointed to the 21st Senatorial District due to the resignation of Michael White.
May 23, 1990: Sean D. Logan is appointed to the 3rd House District due to the resignation of John Shivers.
July 20, 1990: Cheryl Winkler is appointed to the 20th House District due to the resignation of Tom Pottenger.

Senate

Leadership

Majority leadership
 President of the Senate: Stanley Aronoff
 President pro tempore of the Senate: David Hobson
 Assistant pro tempore: Richard Finan
 Whip: Eugene J. Watts

Minority leadership
 Leader: Harry Meshel
 Assistant Leader: Neal Zimmers
 Whip: Eugene Branstool
 Assistant Whip: Michael White

Members of the 118th Ohio Senate

House of Representatives

Leadership

Majority leadership
 Speaker of the House: Vern Riffe
 President pro tempore of the House: Barney Quilter
 Floor Leader: Bill Mallory
 Assistant Majority Floor Leader: Cliff Skeen
 Majority Whip: Patrick Sweeney
 Assistant Majority Whip: Judy Sheerer

Minority leadership
 Leader: Corwin Nixon
 Assistant Leader: Dave Johnson
 Whip: Jo Ann Davidson
 Assistant Whip: Lou Blessing

Members of the 118th Ohio House of Representatives

Appt.- Member was appointed to current House Seat

See also
Ohio House of Representatives membership, 126th General Assembly
Ohio House of Representatives membership, 125th General Assembly
 List of Ohio state legislatures

References
Ohio House of Representatives official website
Project Vote Smart – State House of Ohio
Map of Ohio House Districts
Ohio District Maps 2002–2012
2006 election results from Ohio Secretary of State

Ohio legislative sessions
Ohio
Ohio
1989 in Ohio
1990 in Ohio